Breathe Out, Breathe In is the fifth studio album by English rock band The Zombies, released on 9 May 2011.

The band recorded a music video for the album's song "Any Other Way", their first music video since the band's original formation in 1961. Two of the songs on the album are remakes of earlier recordings by the band Argent. "Christmas for the Free" was originally released in 1973 on the album In Deep. "Shine on Sunshine" was originally released in 1975 on the album Circus.

Track listing
All tracks composed by Rod Argent, except where noted.

Personnel
The Zombies
Colin Blunstone - lead vocals
Rod Argent - keyboards, backing and lead vocals, production
Tom Toomey - guitar
Jim Rodford - bass, backing vocals
Steve Rodford - drums

References

External links
Official video for 

2011 albums
The Zombies albums
Albums produced by Rod Argent
Rhino Records albums